Vyšný Čaj is a village and municipality in Košice-okolie District in the Košice Region of eastern Slovakia.

Etymology
Vyšný Čaj and Nižný (Lower) Čaj come from Slavic personal name Čavoj (ča-: to expect, voj: militia, warrior).  1335 Chay, 1337/1359/1382 poss. Chauvay Superior, 1427 Chay, Felsew Chay, 1630 Felseo Chay, 1773 Wissny Csaj, Felsö-Csáj.

History
In historical records the village was first mentioned in 1335 when it belonged to Trstené pri Hornáde Lords.

Geography
The village lies at an altitude of 234 metres and covers an area of 4.828 km². The municipality has a population of 300 people.

References

External links
https://web.archive.org/web/20070513023228/http://www.statistics.sk/mosmis/eng/run.html
http://www.cassovia.sk/vcaj

Villages and municipalities in Košice-okolie District